Amit Sinha (born 26 November 1988) is an Indian cricketer who plays domestic cricket for Assam. He is a right-handed middle order batsman. Sinha made his List A debut for Assam on 19 February 2007 against Tripura at Cuttack in the 2006–07 Ranji One-Day Trophy. In December 2009, he made his first-class debut against Tripura at Guwahati in a Ranji Trophy match.

References

External links
 

1988 births
Living people
Indian cricketers
Assam cricketers
People from Nagaon district
Cricketers from Assam